Jean-Guy Guilbault (14 March 1931 – 4 March 2022) was a Canadian businessman and politician who was a member of the House of Commons of Canada.

Guilbault attended schools in Drummondville and Montreal. In federal politics, he represented the Quebec riding of Drummond where he was first elected in the 1984 federal election and re-elected in 1988, therefore becoming a member in the 33rd and 34th Canadian Parliaments. He was a member of the Progressive Conservative party.

Guilbault left federal politics after his defeat in the 1993 federal election to Pauline Picard of the Bloc Québécois. Guilbault died on 4 March 2022, at the age of 90.

References

External links 
 

1931 births
2022 deaths
Members of the House of Commons of Canada from Quebec
People from Drummondville
Progressive Conservative Party of Canada MPs
Businesspeople from Quebec
French Quebecers